The 2010 Swedish Golf Tour, known as the Nordea Tour for sponsorship reasons, was the 25th season of the Swedish Golf Tour, a series of professional golf tournaments for women held in Sweden and Finland.

2010 was the first of seven seasons with Nordea as the main sponsor of the Tour, after Scandinavian Airlines (SAS) pulled out as main sponsor after only two seasons. The schedule remained largely unchanged from 2009, but the LET event Göteborg Masters cancelled during 2009 did not return.

Kaisa Ruuttila from Finland won four events and the Order of Merit.

Schedule
The season consisted of 13 tournaments played between May and October, where one event was held in Finland.

Order of Merit

See also
2010 Swedish Golf Tour (men's tour)

References

External links
Official homepage of the Swedish Golf Tour

Swedish Golf Tour (women)
Swedish Golf Tour (women)